The 2019 TCU Horned Frogs football team represented Texas Christian University during the 2019 NCAA Division I FBS football season. The Horned Frogs competed as a member of the Big 12 Conference and played their home games at Amon G. Carter Stadium on campus in Fort Worth, Texas. They were led by 19th-year head coach Gary Patterson. They finished the season 5–7, 3–6 in Big 12 play to finish in a tie for seventh place.

Preseason

Big 12 media poll
The 2019 Big 12 media days were held July 15–16, 2019 in Frisco, Texas. In the Big 12 preseason media poll, TCU was predicted to finish in fourth in the standings.

Preseason All-Big 12 teams
To be released.

Schedule
TCU's 2019 schedule will begin with three non-conference games: at home against Arkansas–Pine Bluff of the Southwestern Athletic Conference (SWAC), on the road against Purdue of the Big Ten Conference, and home again against SMU of the American Athletic Conference (AAC). In Big 12 Conference play, the Horned Frogs will play four home games against Kansas, Texas, Baylor, and West Virginia; and five road games against Iowa State, Kansas State, Oklahoma State, Texas Tech, and Oklahoma.

Source:

Personnel

Roster

Game summaries

Arkansas–Pine Bluff

at Purdue

SMU

Kansas

Texas Christian scored 21 points in the first quarter against Kansas and led 38–0 at halftime, with Max Duggan making his second consecutive start at quarterback. However, Alex Delton still was on record as a team captain and he saw play time in the second half. Headed into the fourth quarter with no score, Kansas had only managed 55 yards on 34 plays. Quarterback Carter Stanley finished 12–29 in passing with 84 yards, but the Jayhawks managed to score in the fourth quarter to avoid being shut out. The game ended with TCU scoring 51 to the Jayhawks' 14.

at Iowa State

at Kansas State

Both Texas Christian and Kansas State entered the game having a week off from the regular season schedule. TCU featured quarterback Alex Delton, a former player for Kansas State who transferred to TCU during the off-season. But when the game time came around, Delton only completed two passes for a total of six yards and the bulk of the passing was completed by freshman Max Duggan, who put up 29 passes with 16 completions for a total of 132 yards passing.

Kansas State gained an early 7–0 lead and never trailed the rest of the way. TCU head coach Gary Patterson said, “I think you have an 80 percent chance of getting beat if you have a punt blocked.” Kansas State did block a punt in this game, as did Iowa State in the previous game for TCU that they also lost. The final score of the game was Kansas State 24, Texas Christian 17.

Texas

at Oklahoma State

Baylor

Heading into Week 11 of the college football season, rival Baylor was on top of the Big 12 conference standings with an undefeated 8–0 record. Recent victories over West Virginia and Texas Tech were close and TCU was looking to win a few more games to become eligible for a bowl game. Both teams have been able to score and the game was listed as one of the most "compelling matchups" for the week by MSN Sports.

at Texas Tech

at Oklahoma

West Virginia

Rankings

Players drafted into the NFL

References

TCU
TCU Horned Frogs football seasons
TCU Horned Frogs football